Carey D. Vanier Sr. (born August 3, 1981) is a retired Guyanese-American mixed martial arts fighter. A professional from 2006 until 2014, he is perhaps best remembered for his stint in Bellator.

Background
He began wrestling at an early age and as a senior in high school, he finished sixth at the state wrestling finals. He enrolled at Ridgewater College where he was eventually named an All-American.

Mixed martial arts career

Bellator
After obtaining an 8-2 record, Carey was signed onto the Bellator brand and will enter their second season lightweight tournament that started in April, 2010. Carey won his first fight against Joe Duarte via TKO in the third round. The win moved him onto the semi-final round where he lost to Toby Imada.

He fought and defeated UFC veteran, Rich Clementi, in a closely contested match, at Bellator 28. At one point in the second round, Vanier grabbed a hold of the fence to defend a takedown. In the third round he landed two illegal knee strikes to Clementi's face, however, the referee did not deduct a point for them. The win earned Vanier a spot in the fourth season lightweight tournament.

In October, Vanier moved to New Mexico and began training with  Greg Jackson's team. His first fight as a part of his new team came at Bellator 36 against Lloyd Woodard. Vanier was defeated in the second round via TKO. The fight was a quarter-final fight in Bellator's season four lightweight tournament.

Personal life
Vanier was born in Hopetown Village, Guyana and moved to Minnesota at age 3 where he has lived ever since. After graduating from Ridgewater, he held off on fighting in order to support his young son, Carey Jr. He took a job at the local Best Buy and worked his way up the ranks until he was named store manager.

Mixed martial arts record

|-
|Loss
|align=center|11–6
|David Michaud
|Submission (guillotine choke)
|Dakota FC 17: Winter Brawl 2014
|
|align=center|1
|align=center|4:30
|Fargo, North Dakota, United States
|Catchweight (160 lb) bout.
|-
|Loss
|align=center|11–5
|Dakota Cochrane
|KO (elbow)
|Victory Fighting Championship 40
|
|align=center|1
|align=center|4:23
|Ralston, Nebraska, United States
|
|-
|Win
|align=center|11–4
|Jordan Larson
|Submission (guillotine choke)
|CFX 33 - Minnesota vs. Japan
|
|align=center|3
|align=center|2:14
|Minneapolis, Minnesota, United States
|
|-
|Loss
|align=center|10–4
|Lloyd Woodard
|TKO (punches)
|Bellator 36
|
|align=center|2
|align=center|0:46
|Shreveport, Louisiana, United States
|
|-
|Win
|align=center|10–3
|Rich Clementi
|Decision (split)
|Bellator 28
|
|align=center|3
|align=center|5:00
|New Orleans, Louisiana, United States
|For spot in Season Four Lightweight Tournament.
|-
|Loss
|align=center|9–3
|Toby Imada
|Submission (armbar)
|Bellator 17
|
|align=center|2
|align=center|3:33
|Boston, Massachusetts, United States
|
|-
|Win
|align=center|9–2
|Joe Duarte
|TKO (punches)
|Bellator 13
|
|align=center|3
|align=center|4:14
|Hollywood, Florida, United States
|
|-
|Win
|align=center|8–2
|Paul Mann
|TKO (punches)
|Shogun Fights 1
|
|align=center|2
|align=center|2:09
|Baltimore, Maryland, United States
|
|-
|Win
|align=center|7–2
|Peter Grimes
|Decision (split)
|Cage Conflict Championships
|
|align=center|5
|align=center|5:00
|Appleton, Wisconsin, United States
|
|-
|Win
|align=center|6–2
|Derek Abram
|Submission (armbar)
|Seconds Out
|
|align=center|2
|align=center|1:26
|Maplewood, Minnesota, United States
|
|-
|Win
|align=center|5–2
|Sam Keigley
|Submission (punches)
|Minnesota Combat Sports
|
|align=center|1
|align=center|N/A
|St. Paul, Minnesota, United States
|
|-
|Win
|align=center|4–2
|Jesse Anderson
|TKO (punches) 
|Brutaal - Fight Night
|
|align=center|1
|align=center|2:11
|St. Cloud, Minnesota, United States
|
|-
|Win
|align=center|3–2
|Seko Tongiola
|TKO (punches) 
|Brutaal - Fight Night
|
|align=center|1
|align=center|0:57
|Maplewood, Minnesota, United States
|
|-
|Loss
|align=center|2–2
|Marshall Martin
|Submission (triangle choke)
|Max Fights 2
|
|align=center|1
|align=center|0:59
|Fargo, North Dakota, United States
|
|-
|Win
|align=center|2–1
|Wes Ronchi
|Submission (choke)
|UCS - Battle on the Bay 9
|
|align=center|2
|align=center|N/A
|Superior, Wisconsin, United States
|
|-
|Win
|align=center|1–1
|Logan Beckman
|TKO (punches)
|Twin Cities Throwdown 3
|
|align=center|2
|align=center|N/A
|Burnsville, Minnesota, United States
|
|-
|Loss
|align=center|0–1
|Nik Lentz
|TKO (punches)
|Extreme Fighting Xtreme
|
|align=center|1
|align=center|N/A
|Minneapolis, Minnesota, United States
|

References

External links
 

1983 births
Living people
American male mixed martial artists
Guyanese male mixed martial artists
Lightweight mixed martial artists
Mixed martial artists utilizing collegiate wrestling
American male sport wrestlers
Guyanese male sport wrestlers
Guyanese emigrants to the United States
People from Essequibo Islands-West Demerara